The Siam Mercantile Gazette was an English-language weekly newspaper published in Thailand from 6 October 1888 until November 1891. Its proprietor and manager was Mr. Richard Götte and its editor was Mr. John Marshall. On 1 October 1891, Mr. J.J. Lillie became editor of the newspaper. On 19 November 1891, Mr. Richard Götte was found guilty of disseminating a libel upon Mr. Bethge, the Director-General of Siamese Railways, by means of two articles which appeared in the issue published on 24 October 1891. The Siam Mercantile Gazette was succeeded by the Siam Free Press.

See also 
Timeline of English-language newspapers published in Thailand
List of online newspaper archives - Thailand

References 

Defunct newspapers published in Thailand
English-language newspapers published in Asia
English-language newspapers published in Thailand
Mass media in Bangkok